Old Mill may refer to:

Animations
The Old Mill, a 1937 Academy Award-winning Silly Symphonies cartoon produced by Walt Disney
The Old Mill Pond, a 1936 Academy Award nominated short film directed by Hugh Harman

Places

Canada
 Old Mill Park (Shawnigan Lake), in Shawnigan Lake, British Columbia
Old Mill, Toronto, a neighbourhood of Toronto, Canada
Old Mill Toronto, an historic mill in Toronto
Old Mill (TTC), a subway station there

United Kingdom
Old Mill, Cornwall, a place in Cornwall

United States
John Wood Old Mill, Merrillville, Indiana, listed on the NRHP in Indiana
Old Mill House, Le Claire, Iowa, listed on the NRHP in Iowa
Old Mill Site Historic District, a historic district in Hatfield, Massachusetts
Old Mill (West Tisbury, Massachusetts)
Old Mill State Park WPA/Rustic Style Historic Resources, Argyle, Minnesota, listed on the NRHP in Minnesota
Ramsey Mill and Old Mill Park, ruin of a water-powered gristmill in Hastings, Minnesota
Old Mill at Montauk State Park, Salem, Missouri, listed on the NRHP in Missouri
Old Mill at Tinton Falls, Tinton Falls, New Jersey, listed on the NRHP in New Jersey
Old Mill Museum (Dundee, Michigan)
The Old Mill (Nantucket, Massachusetts)
The Old Mill (San Marino, California), a former grist mill in San Marino, California
Old Mill (University of Vermont), a historic campus building in Burlington, Vermont
Old Mill (Vermilion, Ohio), listed on the NRHP in Erie County, Ohio
 Calvert Mill/Washington Mill or The Old Mill, an historic mill located on Old Mill Road in Washington, Virginia
 Crystal Mill or The Old Mill
Pigeon Forge Mill, commonly called the "Old Mill," NRHP listing in Pigeon Forge, Tennessee
 T. R. Pugh Memorial Park or The Old Mill, a NRHP listing in North Little Rock, Arkansas

Windmills

Australia
Old Mill, Perth

England
Old Mill, Aldbrough,  a windmill in the East Riding of Yorkshire
Old Mill, Amberley, a windmill in West Sussex 
Old Mill, Ashington, a windmill in West Sussex 
Old Mill, Barnham, a windmill in West Sussex 
Old Mill, Barrow, a windmill in Suffolk 
Old Mill, Beckley, a windmill in East Sussex 
Old Mill, Beddingham, a windmill in East Sussex
Old Mill, Bethersden, a windmill in Kent
Old Mill, Bosham, a windmill in West Sussex
Old Mill, Bramford, Coseley, a windmill in Staffordshire
Old Mill, The Dicker, Chiddingly, a windmill in East Sussex
Old Mill, Chidham, a windmill in West Sussex
Old Mill, Compton, a windmill in West Sussex
Old Mill, Cross in Hand, a windmill in East Sussex
Old Mill, Eastbourne, a windmill in East Sussex
Old Mill, East Ruston, a windmill in Norfolk
Old Mill, Fairlight, a windmill in East Sussex
Old Mill, Falmer, a windmill in East Sussex
Old Mill, Findon, a windmill in West Sussex
Old Mill, Forest Row, a windmill in East Sussex
Old Mill, Guestling, a windmill in East Sussex
Old Mill, Hawkinge, a windmill in Kent
Old Mill, Hellingly, a windmill in East Sussex
Old Mill, Henfield, a windmill in West Sussex
Old Mill, Keyingham,  a windmill in the East Riding of Yorkshire
Old Mill, Little Horsted, a windmill in East Sussex
Old Mill, Lydd, a windmill in Kent
Old Mill, Margate, Kent.
Old Mill, Newick, a windmill in East Sussex
Old Mill, New Romney, a windmill in Kent
Old Mill, Northbourne, a windmill in Kent
Old Mill, Northchapel, a windmill in West Sussex
Old Mill, Northiam, a windmill in East Sussex
Old Mill, Oving, a windmill in West Sussex
Old Mill, Petworth, a windmill in West Sussex
Old Mill, Playden, a windmill in East Sussex
Old Mill, Plumstead, a windmill in Norfolk
Old Mill, Preston next Wingham, a windmill in Kent
Old Mill, Prittlewell, a windmill in Essex
Old Mill, Ripe, a windmill in East Sussex
Old Mill, Rodmell, a windmill in East Sussex
Old Mill, Rusper, a windmill in West Sussex
Old Mill, Rye, a windmill in East Sussex
Old Mill, Seaton Ross,  a windmill in the East Riding of Yorkshire
Old Mill, Shoreham, a windmill in West Sussex
Old Mill, Southam, a windmill in Warwickshire
Old Mill, Swingfield, a windmill in Kent
Old Mill, Takeley, a windmill in Essex
Old Mill, Thaxted, a windmill in Essex
Old Mill, Uckfield, a windmill in East Sussex
Old Mill, West Kingsdown, Kent
Old Mill, Whatlington, a windmill in East Sussex
Old Mill, Wicklewood, a windmill in Norfolk
Old Mill, Wighton, a windmill in Norfolk
Old Mill, Willesborough, a windmill in Kent
Old Mill, Willingdon, a windmill in East Sussex
Old Mill, Wittersham, a windmill in Kent
Old Mill, Woodham Mortimer, a windmill in Essex
Old Mill, Worlingworth, a windmill in Suffolk

Glover's Old Mill, Blean, a windmill in Kent
Lashmar's Old Mill, Brighton, a windmill in East Sussex
Tivoli Old Mill, St Leonard's, a windmill in East Sussex
Dilnot's Old Mill, Waltham, a windmill in Kent
Old Mill Green Mill, Wetheringsett, a windmill in Suffolk
Ruiton Old Mill, Sedgeley, a windmill in Staffordshire

United States
Old Mill, Addison, a windmill in Illinois
Old Mill, East Orleans, a windmill in Massachusetts
Old Mill, Nantucket, a windmill in Massachusetts
Old Mill, Sandwich, a windmill in Massachusetts
Old Mill, Tinley Park, a windmill in Illinois
Franzen's Old Mill, Golden, a windmill in Illinois
Old Emmon's Estate Mill, Falmouth, a windmill in Massachusetts
Old Higgins Farm Mill, Brewster, a windmill in Massachusetts
Old Mill Farm Mill, Winnetka, a windmill in Illinois

Watermills

England
Old Mill, Bexley, on the River Cray, Kent
Old Mill, Borough Green, on the River Bourne, Kent
Old Mill, Eynsford, on the River Darent, Kent
Old Mill, Hollingbourne, also known as Old Mill, Leeds, on the River Len, Kent
Old Mill, Loose, on the Loose Stream, Kent	
Old Mill, South Darenth, on the River Darent, Kent

United States
 Old Mill (West Tisbury, Massachusetts)
 Old Mill (Vermilion, Ohio), listed on the NRHP in Erie County, Ohio
 Old Mill, Crystal, Colorado, listed on the NRHP in Gunnison County, Colorado

Other uses
 The Old Mill, former location of and alternative name for the National Motor Museum, Birdwood, South Australia
Old Mill (ride), a type of amusement ride
Old Mill, Manchester, part of the Murrays' Mills complex in North West England
The Old Mill, part of Fantasyland in Disneyland Park, Paris, France

See also
Old Mill Road Bridge, Rocky Ridge, MD
Old Mill School (disambiguation)
Old Dutch Mill (disambiguation)
Oudemolen (disambiguation)